Witkowo  is a village in the administrative district of Gmina Smołdzino, within Słupsk County, Pomeranian Voivodeship, in northern Poland.

The village has a population of 40.

References

Witkowo